Ruth Mary Hussey CB OBE was the chief medical officer for Wales.  She was appointed in 2012, succeeding Tony Jewell. She retired in March 2016.

Biography
Hussey was born in the Conwy Valley, living there until she studied medicine at the University of Liverpool School of Medicine. She was a committee member and honorary life member of the Liverpool Medical Students Society. She was regional director of public health and senior medical at NHS North West. 

In 2017-18, Hussey chaired a panel of experts who looked for ways to improve the health and social care system in Wales. The panel proposed far-reaching changes to the system.

Awards and honours
 Hussey was appointed Companion of the Order of the Bath (CB) in the 2016 New Year Honours.

References

Year of birth missing (living people)
Living people
Chief Medical Officers for Wales
Welsh women medical doctors
20th-century Welsh medical doctors
21st-century Welsh medical doctors
Companions of the Order of the Bath
Officers of the Order of the British Empire
20th-century women physicians
21st-century women physicians
Deputy Lieutenants of Merseyside